Ralph E. Davis Pioneer Stadium is a stadium in Platteville, Wisconsin.  It is used for collegiate and high school American football and collegiate soccer, and is the home field of the University of Wisconsin–Platteville "Pioneers".

Pioneer Stadium opened in 1972 and holds 10,000 people.  It is the second largest stadium in Division III collegiate football, and the largest soccer stadium.  From 1984 to 2001, the stadium and other university facilities were also used as the Chicago Bears' training camp home.

The stadium is named for Ralph Emerson Davis, a geologist and "godfather of the natural gas industry," who served as the Director of the Wisconsin Mining School, which would eventually merge to form the University of Wisconsin–Platteville. Davis's generous donation helped complete the $1.25 million facilities.

In 2005, stadium renovations included replacing the grass surface with a Pro-Grass in-fill surface.

On June 16, 2014, the stadium was damaged by a tornado.

References

Buildings and structures in Grant County, Wisconsin
College football venues
American football venues in Wisconsin
Soccer venues in Wisconsin
Wisconsin–Platteville Pioneers football
1972 establishments in Wisconsin
Sports venues completed in 1972
College soccer venues in the United States